{{Automatic taxobox
 | fossil_range = Paleocene- Recent
 | image = Vitis californica with grapes.jpg
 | image_caption = Vitis californica with fruit
 | taxon = Vitis
 | authority = L.
 | type_species = Vitis vinifera
 | type_species_authority = L.
 | subdivision_ranks = Species
 | subdivision_ref = 
 | subdivision =
{{collapsible list|
V. acerifolia
V. adenoclada
V. aestivalis
V. amazonica
V. amurensis
V. × andersonii
V. arizonica
V. baileyana]]
V. balansana
V. bashanica
V. bellula
V. berlandieri
V. betulifolia
V. biformis
V. blancoi
V. bloodworthiana
V. bourgaeana
V. bryoniifolia
V. californica
V. × champinii
[[Vitis chontalensis|V. chontalensisV. chunganensis
V. chungii
V. cinerea
[[Vitis cissoides|V. cissoides]]V. coignetiae
[[Vitis cordifolia|V. cordifolia]]V. davidii
V. × doaniana
V. erythrophylla
V. fengqinensis
[[Vitis figariana|V. figariana]]V. flexuosa
V. girdiana
V. hancockii
V. heyneana
V. hui
V. jacquemontii
V. jaegeriana
V. jinggangensis
V. jinzhainensis
V. kelungensis
V. labrusca
V. labruscana
V. lanceolatifoliosa
V. linsecomii
V. longquanensis
V. luochengensis
V. menghaiensis
V. mengziensis
V. monticola
V. mustangensis
V. nesbittiana
V. × novae-angliae
V. palmata
V. peninsularis
V. piasezkii
V. pilosonerva
V. popenoei
V. pseudoreticulata
V. pubescens
V. retordii
V. riparia
V. romanetii
V. rotundifolia
V. rupestris
V. ruyuanensis
V. shenxiensis
V. shuttleworthii
V. silvestrii
V. sinocinerea
V. × slavinii
V. thunbergii
V. tiliifolia
V. treleasei
V. tsoii
V. vinifera
V. vulpina
V. wenchouensis
V. wilsonae
V. wuhanensis
V. xunyangensis
V. yeshanensis
V. yunnanensis
V. zhejiang-adstricta}}

}}Vitis (grapevine) is a genus of 79 accepted species of vining plants in the flowering plant family Vitaceae.  The genus is made up of species predominantly from the Northern Hemisphere. It is economically important as the source of grapes, both for direct consumption of the fruit and for fermentation to produce wine. The study and cultivation of grapevines is called viticulture.

Most cultivated Vitis varieties are wind-pollinated with hermaphroditic flowers containing both male and female reproductive structures, while wild species are dieceous. These flowers are grouped in bunches called inflorescences. In many species, such as Vitis vinifera, each successfully pollinated flower becomes a grape berry with the inflorescence turning into a cluster of grapes. While the flowers of the grapevines are usually very small, the berries are often large and brightly colored with sweet flavors that attract birds and other animals to disperse the seeds contained within the berries.

Grapevines usually only produce fruit on shoots that came from buds that were developed during the previous growing season. In viticulture, this is one of the principles behind pruning the previous year's growth (or "One year old wood") that includes shoots that have turned hard and woody during the winter (after harvest in commercial viticulture). These vines will be pruned either into a cane which will support 8 to 15 buds or to a smaller spur which holds 2 to 3 buds.

Description

Flower buds are formed late in the growing season and overwinter for blooming in spring of the next year. They produce leaf-opposed cymes. Vitis is distinguished from other genera of Vitaceae by having petals which remain joined at the tip and detach from the base to fall together as a calyptra or 'cap'. The flowers are mostly bisexual, pentamerous, with a hypogynous disk. The calyx is greatly reduced or nonexistent in most species and the petals are joined together at the tip into one unit but separated at the base. The fruit is a berry, ovoid in shape and juicy, with a two-celled ovary each containing two ovules, thus normally producing four seeds per flower (or fewer by way of aborted embryos).

Other parts of the vine include the tendrils which are leaf-opposed, branched in Vitis vinifera, and are used to support the climbing plant by twining onto surrounding structures such as branches or the trellising of a vine-training system.

In the wild, all species of Vitis are normally dioecious, but under domestication, variants with perfect flowers appear to have been selected.

The genus Vitis is divided into two subgenera, Euvitis Planch. have 38 chromosomes (n=19) with berries borne on clusters and Muscadinia Planch. 40 (n=20) with small clusters.

Wild grapes can resemble the single-seeded Menispermum canadense (moonseed), which is toxic.

Species

Most Vitis species are found mostly in the temperate regions of the Northern Hemisphere in North America and eastern Asia, exceptions being a few in the tropics and the wine grape Vitis vinifera which originated in southern Europe and southwestern Asia. Grape species occur in widely different geographical areas and show a great diversity of form.

Their growth makes leaf collection challenging and polymorphic leaves make identification of species difficult.

Many species are sufficiently closely related to allow easy interbreeding and the resultant interspecific hybrids are invariably fertile and vigorous. Thus the concept of a species is less well defined and more likely represents the identification of different ecotypes of Vitis that have evolved in distinct geographical and environmental circumstances.

The exact number of species is not certain, with more than 65 species in Asia in particular being poorly defined. Approximately 25 species are known in North America and just one, V. vinifera has Eurasian origins; some of the more notable include:Vitis aestivalis, the summer grape, native to the Eastern United States, especially the Southeastern United StatesVitis amurensis, native to the Asian continent, including parts of Siberia and ChinaVitis arizonica, The Arizona grape is native to Arizona, Utah, Nevada, California, New Mexico, Texas, and Northern Mexico.Vitis berlandieri, native to the southern North America, primarily Texas, New Mexico and Arkansas. Primarily known for good tolerance against soils with a high content of lime, which can cause chlorosis in many vines of American originVitis californica, the California wild grape, or Northern California grape, or Pacific grape, is a wild grape species widespread across much of California as well as southwestern OregonVitis coignetiae, the crimson glory vine, a species from East Asia grown as an ornamental plant for its crimson autumn foliage
 Vitis labrusca L., the fox grapevine, sometimes used for winemaking and for jam. Native to the Eastern United States and Canada. The Concord grape was derived by a cross with this speciesVitis riparia, the riverbank grapevine, sometimes used for winemaking and for jam. Native to the entire Eastern United States and north to QuebecVitis rotundifolia (syn. Muscadinia rotundifolia), the muscadine, used for jams and wine. Native to the Southeastern United States from Delaware to the Gulf of MexicoVitis rupestris, the rock grapevine, used for breeding of Phylloxera resistant rootstock. Native to the Southern United StatesVitis vinifera, the European grapevine. Native to the Mediterranean and Central Asia.Vitis vulpina, the frost grape, native to the Eastern United States, from Massachusetts to Florida, and west to Nebraska, Kansas, and Texas Treated by some as a synonym of V. riparia.Plants of the World Online also includes:

 Vitis acerifolia Raf.
 Vitis aestivalis Michx.
 Vitis baihuashanensis M.S.Kang & D.Z.Lu
 Vitis balansana Planch.
 Vitis bashanica P.C.He
 Vitis bellula (Rehder) W.T.Wang
 Vitis betulifolia Diels & Gilg
 Vitis biformis Rose
 Vitis blancoi Munson
 Vitis bloodworthiana Comeaux
 Vitis bourgaeana Planch.
 Vitis bryoniifolia Bunge
 Vitis californica Benth.
 Vitis × champinii Planch.
 Vitis chunganensis Hu
 Vitis chungii F.P.Metcalf
 Vitis cinerea (Engelm.) Millardet
 Vitis coignetiae Pulliat ex Planch.
 Vitis davidi (Rom.Caill.) Foëx
 Vitis × doaniana Munson ex Viala
 Vitis erythrophylla W.T.Wang
 Vitis fengqinensis C.L.Li
 Vitis ficifolia Bunge
 Vitis flavicosta Mickel & Beitel
 Vitis flexuosa Thunb.
 Vitis girdiana Munson
 Vitis hancockii Hance
 Vitis heyneana Schult.
 Vitis hissarica Vassilcz.
 Vitis hui W.C.Cheng
 Vitis jaegeriana Comeaux
 Vitis jinggangensis W.T.Wang
 Vitis jinzhainensis X.S.Shen
 Vitis kiusiana Momiy.
 Vitis lanceolatifoliosa C.L.Li
 Vitis longquanensis P.L.Chiu
 Vitis luochengensis W.T.Wang
 Vitis menghaiensis C.L.Li
 Vitis mengziensis C.L.Li
 Vitis metziana Miq.
 Vitis monticola Buckley
 Vitis mustangensis Buckley
 Vitis nesbittiana Comeaux
 Vitis × novae-angliae Fernald
 Vitis novogranatensis Moldenke
 Vitis nuristanica Vassilcz.
 Vitis palmata Vahl
 Vitis pedicellata M.A.Lawson
 Vitis peninsularis M.E.Jones
 Vitis piasezkii Maxim.
 Vitis pilosonervia F.P.Metcalf
 Vitis popenoei J.L.Fennell
 Vitis pseudoreticulata W.T.Wang
 Vitis qinlingensis P.C.He
 Vitis retordii Rom.Caill. ex Planch.
 Vitis romanetii Rom.Caill.
 Vitis ruyuanensis C.L.Li
 Vitis saccharifera Makino
 Vitis shenxiensis C.L.Li
 Vitis shuttleworthii House
 Vitis silvestrii Pamp.
 Vitis sinocinerea W.T.Wang
 Vitis sinoternata W.T.Wang
 Vitis tiliifolia Humb. & Bonpl. ex Schult.
 Vitis tsoi Merr.
 Vitis wenchowensis C.Ling
 Vitis wenxianensis W.T.Wang
 Vitis wilsoniae H.J.Veitch
 Vitis wuhanensis C.L.Li
 Vitis xunyangensis P.C.He
 Vitis yunnanensis C.L.Li
 Vitis zhejiang-adstricta P.L.Chiu

There are many cultivars of grapevines; most are cultivars of V. vinifera. One of them includes, Vitis 'Ornamental Grape'.

Hybrid grapes also exist, and these are primarily crosses between V. vinifera and one or more of V. labrusca, V. riparia or V. aestivalis. Hybrids tend to be less susceptible to frost and disease (notably phylloxera), but wine from some hybrids may have a little of the characteristic "foxy" taste of V. labrusca.

The Latin word Vitis is feminine, and therefore adjectival species names take feminine forms, such as V. vinifera.

 Ecology 

Phylloxera is an American root aphid that devastated V. vinifera vineyards in Europe when accidentally introduced in the late 19th century. Attempts were made to breed in resistance from American species, but many winemakers and customers did not like the unusual flavour profile of the hybrid vines. However, V. vinifera grafts readily onto rootstocks of the American species and their hybrids with V. vinifera, and most commercial production of grapes now relies on such grafts.

The black vine weevil is another root pest.

Grapevines are used as food plants by the larvae of some Lepidoptera species.

Commercial distribution

According to the UN's Food and Agriculture Organization (FAO), 75,866 square kilometres of the world is dedicated to grapes. Approximately 71% of world grape production is used for wine, 27% as fresh fruit, and 2% as dried fruit. A portion of grape production goes to producing grape juice to be used as a sweetener for fruits canned "with no added sugar" and "100% natural". The area dedicated to vineyards is increasing by about 2% per year.

The following list of top wine-producers shows the corresponding areas dedicated to grapes (regardless of the grapes’ final destination):

Domestic cultivation
Grapevines are widely cultivated by gardeners, and numerous suppliers cater specifically for this trade. The plants are valued for their decorative foliage, often colouring brightly in autumn; their ability to clothe walls, pergolas and arches, thus providing shade; and their fruits, which may be eaten as dessert or provide the basis for homemade wines. Popular varieties include:-

Buckland Sweetwater' (white dessert)
'Chardonnay' (white wine)
'Foster's Seedling' (white dessert)
'Muscat of Alexandria' (white dessert)
'Müller-Thurgau' (white wine)
'Phoenix' (white wine)
'Pinot noir' (red wine)
'Regent' (red wine)
'Schiava Grossa' (red dessert)
'Seyval blanc' (white wine)

The following varieties have gained the Royal Horticultural Society's Award of Garden Merit:-

'Boskoop Glory' (dessert/wine)
'Brant' (black dessert)
'Claret Cloak' or 'Frovit' (ornamental)
'New York Muscat' (black dessert)
'Purpurea' (ornamental)

 Uses 
The fruit of several Vitis species are grown commercially for consumption as fresh grapes and for fermentation into wine. Vitis vinifera is the most important such species.

The leaves of several species of grapevine are edible and are used in the production of dolmades and Vietnamese lot leaves.

 Culture 
The grapevine (typically Vitis vinifera'') has been used as a symbol since ancient times. In Greek mythology, Dionysus (called Bacchus by the Romans) was god of the vintage and, therefore, a grapevine with bunches of the fruit are among his attributes. His attendants at the Bacchanalian festivals hence had the vine as an attribute, together with the thyrsus, the latter often entwined with vine branches. For the same reason, the Greek wine cup (cantharos) is commonly decorated with the vine and grapes, wine being drunk as a libation to the god.

The grapevine has a profound symbolic meaning in Jewish tradition and culture since antiquity. It is referenced 55 times in the Hebrew Bible (Old Testament), along with grapes and wine, which are also frequently mentioned (55 and 19, respectively). It is regarded as one of the Seven Species, and is employed several times in the Bible as a symbol of the Israelites as the chosen people. The grapevine has a prominent place in Jewish rituals: the wine was given a special blessing, "creator of the fruit of the vine", and the Kiddush blessing is recited over wine or grape juice on Shabbat and Jewish holidays. It is also employed in various parables and sayings in rabbinic literature. According to Josephus and the Mishnah, a golden vine was hung over the inner chamber of the Second Temple. The grapevine is featured on Hasmonean and Bar Kokhba revolt coinage, and as a decoration in mosaic floors of ancient synagogues.

In Christian iconography, the vine also frequently appears. It is mentioned several times in the New Testament. We have the parable of the kingdom of heaven likened to the father starting to engage laborers for his vineyard. The vine is used as symbol of Jesus Christ based on his own statement, "I am the true vine (John 15:1)." In that sense, a vine is placed as sole symbol on the tomb of Constantia, the sister of Constantine the Great, and elsewhere. In Byzantine art, the vine and grapes figure in early mosaics, and on the throne of Maximianus of Ravenna it is used as a decoration.

The vine and wheat ear have been frequently used as symbol of the blood and flesh of Christ, hence figuring as symbols (bread and wine) of the Eucharist and are found depicted on ostensories. Often the symbolic vine laden with grapes is found in ecclesiastical decorations with animals biting at the grapes. At times, the vine is used as symbol of temporal blessing.

In Mandaeism, uthras (angels or celestial beings) are often described as personified grapevines.

See also
Vine staff
Annual growth cycle of grapevines
Old vine

References

Notes

Citations

Further reading

External links

 List of 48 descriptors defined in the GRAPEGEN06 project (selected from the 151 OIV descriptors published in June 2007)

 
Vitaceae genera
Vines
.
Taxa named by Carl Linnaeus
Extant Selandian first appearances